Land Cruiser War may refer to:
War in Darfur, nicknamed the "Land Cruiser War" by Sudanese rebels
Toyota War, named after the Toyota Land Cruiser